Saulo Hernández (born 17 October 1946) is a Puerto Rican boxer. He competed in the men's middleweight event at the 1968 Summer Olympics. At the 1968 Summer Olympics, he lost to Raúl Marrero of Cuba.

References

1946 births
Living people
Puerto Rican male boxers
Olympic boxers of Puerto Rico
Boxers at the 1968 Summer Olympics
Sportspeople from San Juan, Puerto Rico
Middleweight boxers
20th-century Puerto Rican people